The relatively small (75 cm high) limestone Cretan sculpture called the Lady of Auxerre (or Kore of Auxerre), at the Louvre Museum in Paris depicts an archaic  Greek goddess of c. 650 - 625 BCE. It is a Kore ("maiden"),  perhaps a votary rather than the maiden Goddess Persephone herself, for her right hand touches her solar plexus and her left remains stiffly at her side (Basel 2001). It is also possible that the Kore is a depiction of a deceased individual, possibly in a position of prayer.

Maxime Collignon, a Louvre curator, found the sculpture in a storage vault in the Museum of Auxerre, a city east of Paris, in 1907. No provenance is known, and its mysterious arrival at a provincial French museum gave it a journalistic allure, according to the Louvre monograph.

The Archaic sculpture, bearing traces of  polychrome decoration, dates from the 7th century BCE, when Greece was emerging from its Dark Age. She still has the narrow waist of a Minoan-Mycenaean goddess, and her stiff hair suggests Egyptian influence. The Early Archaic style has been fancifully termed "Daedalic."  Its secret, knowing and serene hint of a smile is often characterized as the "archaic smile." Sculptures and painted vases exhibiting correlative styles have been found outside Crete as well as in Rhodes, Corinth and Sparta (Basel 2000).
Excavations in the 1990s by Nikolaos Stampolidis at Eleutherna in Crete have helped establish more precisely a date and place of origin for the Dame d'Auxerre, in the region of Eleutherna and Gortyn, with the recovery from gravesites of very similar carved ivory faces and phallic symbols.

References

Jean-Luc Martinez, 2000. La Dame d'Auxerre (Réunion des Musées Nationaux)

External links
 Encyclopædia Britannica Daedalic sculpture
 (Skulpturhalle, Basel) Ute W. Gottschall, "La Dame d'Auxerre" (German)
 Statue of a woman, known as the "Lady of Auxerre", Louvre Museum official website

7th-century BC works
Archaic Greek sculptures
Art of ancient Crete
Ancient Greek and Roman sculptures of the Louvre
Figurines
Korai